Psittonyssus is a former genus of the mite family Rhinonyssidae that has been determined to be a taxonomic synonym of the genus Tinaminyssus.

Articles created by Qbugbot
Rhinonyssidae